Grațian Sepi (born 30 December 1910 in Vălcani, Austria-Hungary (now in Romania) – deceased  6 March 1977) was a Romanian footballer who played as a striker.

Biography

International career 

While playing in Liga I for Universitatea Cluj, he was picked for the Romania national football team by the joint coaches, Austrian Josef Uridil and Romanian Costel Rădulescu, to play in the 1934 World Cup in Italy. The team was eliminated in the first round after a 2–1 defeat to Czechoslovakia.

Honours

Club
Venus București
Liga I (1): 1936–37
Ripensia Timișoara
Liga I (1): 1937–38

International
Romania
Balkan Cup (2): 1929–31, 1933

References

External links 
 
 

1910 births
1977 deaths
People from Timiș County
People from the Kingdom of Hungary
Romania international footballers
Romanian footballers
1934 FIFA World Cup players
Liga I players
FC Politehnica Timișoara players
Victoria Cluj players
FC Universitatea Cluj players
Venus București players
FC Ripensia Timișoara players
Association football forwards